Queen's House is a former royal residence built between 1616 and 1635 near Greenwich Palace, a few miles down-river from the City of London and now in the Royal Borough of Greenwich. It presently forms a central focus of what is now the Old Royal Naval College with a grand vista leading to the River Thames. Its architect was Inigo Jones, for whom it was a crucial early commission, for Anne of Denmark, the queen of King James VI and I. Queen's House is one of the most important buildings in British architectural history, being the first consciously classical building to have been constructed in the country. It was Jones's first major commission after returning from his 1613–1615 grand tour of Roman, Renaissance, and Palladian architecture in Italy.

Some earlier English buildings, such as Longleat and Burghley House, had made borrowings from the classical style, but these were restricted to small details not applied in a systematic way, or the building may be a mix of different styles. Furthermore, the form of these buildings was not informed by an understanding of classical precedents. Queen's House would have appeared revolutionary to English eyes in its day. Jones is credited with the introduction of Palladianism with the construction of Queen's House, although it diverges from the mathematical constraints of Palladio, and it is likely that the immediate precedent for the H-shaped plan straddling a road is the Villa Medici at Poggio a Caiano by Giuliano da Sangallo. 

The house now forms part of the National Maritime Museum and is used to display parts of its substantial collection of maritime paintings and portraits.

Early history  

The Queen's House is located in Greenwich, London. It was built as an adjunct to the Tudor Palace of Greenwich, previously known, before its redevelopment by Henry VII as the Palace of Placentia, which was a rambling, mainly red-brick building in a more vernacular style. This would have presented a dramatic contrast of appearance to the newer, white-painted House, although the latter was much smaller and really a modern version of an older tradition of private 'garden houses', not a public building, and one used only by the queen's privileged inner circle. The original building, in fact, was intended as a pavilion with a bridge over the London-Dover road, which ran between high walls through the park of the palace. 

Construction of the house began in 1616 but work on the house stopped in April 1618 when Anne became ill and died the next year. Work restarted when the house was given to the queen consort Henrietta Maria in 1629 by King Charles I, and the house was structurally complete by 1635.

However, the house's original use was short—no more than seven years—before the English Civil War began in 1642 and swept away the court culture from which it sprang. Of its interiors, three ceilings and some wall decorations survive in part, but no interior remains in its original state. This process began as early as 1662, when masons removed a niche and term figures and a chimneypiece.

Paintings commissioned by Charles I for the house from Orazio Gentileschi, but now elsewhere, include a ceiling Allegory of Peace and the Arts, now installed at Marlborough House, London, a large Finding of Moses, now on loan from a private collection to the National Gallery, London, and a matching Joseph and Potiphar's Wife still in the Royal Collection.

The Queen's House, though it was scarcely being used, provided the distant focal centre for Sir Christopher Wren's Greenwich Hospital, with a logic and grandeur that has seemed inevitable to architectural historians but in fact depended on Mary II's insistence that the vista to the water from the Queen's House not be impaired.

Construction of the Greenwich Hospital

Although the house survived as an official building – being used for the lying-in-state of Commonwealth Generals-at-Sea Richard Dean (1653) and Robert Blake (1657) – the main palace was progressively demolished from the 1660s to 1690s and replaced by the Royal Hospital for Seamen, built 1696–1751 to the master-plan of Sir Christopher Wren. This is now called the Old Royal Naval College, after its later use from 1873 to 1998. The position of the house, and Queen Mary II's order that it retain its view to the river (only gained on demolition of the older Palace), dictated Wren's Hospital design of two matching pairs of 'courts' separated by a grand 'visto' exactly the width of the house (115 ft). Wren's first plan, which was blocking the view to the Thames, became known to history as "Christopher Wren's faux pas". The whole ensemble at Greenwich forms an impressive architectural vista that stretches from the Thames to Greenwich Park, and is one of the principal features that in 1997 led UNESCO to inscribe 'Maritime Greenwich' as a World Heritage Site.

19th-century additions
From 1806 the house itself was the centre of what, from 1892, became the Royal Hospital School for the sons of seamen. This necessitated new accommodation wings, and a flanking pair to east and west were added and connected to the house by colonnades from 1807 (designed by London Docks architect Daniel Asher Alexander), with further surviving extensions up to 1876. In 1933 the school moved to Holbrook, Suffolk. Its Greenwich buildings, including the house, were converted and restored to become the new National Maritime Museum (NMM), created by Act of Parliament in 1934 and opened in 1937.

The grounds immediately to the north of the house were reinstated in the late 1870s following construction of the cut-and-cover tunnel between Greenwich and Maze Hill stations. The tunnel comprised the continuation of the London and Greenwich Railway and opened in 1878.

Recent years 

In 2012, the grounds to the south of the Queen's House were used to house a stadium for the equestrian events of the Olympic Games. The modern pentathlon was also staged in the grounds of Greenwich Park. The Queen's House itself was used as a VIP centre for the games. Work to prepare the Queen's House involved some internal re-modelling and work on the lead roof to prepare it for security and camera installations.

The house underwent a 14-month restoration beginning in 2015, and reopened on 11 October 2016. One controversial feature was a new ceiling in the main hall created by artist Richard Wright, a Turner prize winner. The house had previously been restored between 1986 and 1999, with contemporary insertions that modernised the building. In some quarters, it provoked some debate: an editorial in The Burlington Magazine, November 1995, alluded to "the recent transformation of the Queen's House into a theme-park interior of fake furniture and fireplaces, tatty modern plaster casts and clip-on chandeliers".

Current use
The house is now primarily used to display the Museum's substantial collection of marine paintings and portraits of the 17th to 20th centuries, and for other public and private events. It is normally open to the public daily, free of charge, along with the other museum galleries and the 17th-century Royal Observatory, Greenwich, which is also part of the National Maritime Museum.

In Autumn 2022, a new painting by the artist Tilly Kettle went on permanent display. The painting depicts Sir Samuel Cornish, 1st Baronet, Richard Kempenfelt and Thomas Parry on HMS Norfolk and was purchased by the National Maritime Museum, with assistance from the Society for Nautical Research.

Notes

External links

Flickr images tagged Queen's House Greenwich

Royal Museums Greenwich: Queen's House

Houses completed in 1635
Houses in the Royal Borough of Greenwich
Country houses in London
Royal buildings in London
Royal residences in the Royal Borough of Greenwich
Grade I listed houses in London
Grade I listed museum buildings
Inigo Jones buildings
Jacobean architecture
Palladian architecture in England
Museums in the Royal Borough of Greenwich
1635 establishments in England
Anne of Denmark
Henrietta Maria